The Compleat Anglerfish (Lasiognathus) is a genus of deep-sea anglerfish in the family Thaumatichthyidae, with six species known from the Atlantic and Pacific Oceans. Its lure apparatus appears to consist of a fishing rod (the projecting basal bone or pteropterygium), a fishing line (the illicium, a modified dorsal fin ray), bait (the bioluminescent esca), and hooks (large dermal denticles). It is also distinctive for an enormous upper jaw with premaxillaries that can be folded down to enclose the much shorter lower jaw.

Systematics
The closest relative of Lasiognathus is Thaumatichthys, which also has enlarged and hinged premaxillaries, escal denticles, and a branched upper operculum. However, there are significant differences between those two taxa as well, which include characteristics that Lasiognathus shares with the oneirodids not found in Thaumatichthys. Bertelsen and Struhsaker (1977) noted that, given the undefined cladistics of the Oneirodidae, it was somewhat subjective whether Lasiognathus and Thaumatichthys were placed in their own family, in separate families, or in the Oneirodidae.

Etymology

Species
There are currently 6 recognized species in this genus:
 Lasiognathus amphirhamphus Pietsch, 2005
 Lasiognathus beebei Regan & Trewavas, 1932
 Lasiognathus dinema Pietsch & T. T. Sutton, 2015 
 Lasiognathus intermedius Bertelsen & Pietsch, 1996
 Lasiognathus saccostoma Regan, 1925
 Lasiognathus waltoni Nolan & Rosenblatt, 1975

Distribution and habitat
Lasiognathus species have been collected from widely scattered localities in the Atlantic and Pacific Oceans. L. beebei is known from the north Atlantic and off Oahu in Hawaiian Islands. L. waltoni is known from the central Pacific, just north of Oahu. L. dinema is known from the northern Gulf of Mexico. L. intermedius is known from the western north Atlantic, the eastern south Pacific, and from off Cape Town, South Africa. L. saccostoma is known from the north Atlantic and off the Hawaiian Islands. L. amphirhamphus is known from off the Madeira Islands in the eastern north Atlantic. Lasiognathus specimens of uncertain species are also known from the north Pacific and the South China Sea. They are pelagic in nature, occurring to a depth of 4,000 m.

Description
Only metamorphosed female Lasiognathus have been collected; there is presumably extreme sexual dimorphism in size and shape, as with other deep-sea anglerfishes. These fishes have a slender body with a large, slender head measuring over 60% of the standard length. The mouth is huge, with the premaxillaries of the upper jaw enlarged and extending well beyond the short lower jaw. The premaxillaries are separated anteriorly and connected by a broad elastic membrane, and are hinged with the upper jaw so that they are able to flip up and down. When in the latter position, the premaxillaries completely enclose the lower jaw. There are numerous long, hooked teeth placed in roughly oblique rows on the premaxillaries.

The pterygiophore (the basal bone supporting the illicium) of Lasiognathus is unusually long amongst anglerfish, measuring some 85% of the standard length. This bone inserts dorsally on the head and is capable of sliding forwards and backwards within a trough that extends the full length of the cranium and between the epaxial musculature on the front half of the body. The illicium is also long, with a terminal esca and 2-3 bony hook-shaped denticles mounted on an appendage at the tip. The escal bulb is equipped with a flap of skin that allows adjustment of the emitted light. The sphenotic spines (above the eyes) are well-developed, as are the two articular spines (at the rear end of the lower jaw). The operculum is divided into two parts, with the dorsal part split into two (rarely three) branches.

The pectoral fin lobe is small, short, and broad; the fin rays number 5 in the dorsal fin, 5 in the anal fin, 14–20 in the pectoral fins, and 9 in the caudal fin. The skin is entirely naked, without spines or denticles. The coloration is a deep chocolate brown. All Lasiognathus are small fishes; L. amphirhamphus is the largest known species at 15.7 cm standard length. L. beebei attains a maximum length of 11.5 cm, L. dinema 9.5 cm, L. intermedius 12.9 cm, L. saccostoma 7.7 cm, and L. waltoni 9.4 cm.

Biology and ecology
Little is known of the life habits of Lasiognathus. William Beebe speculated in 1930 that the fishing apparatus of Lasiognathus might "be cast swiftly ahead, when then the hooks and the lights would so frighten any pursued fish that they would hesitate long enough to be engulfed in the onrushing maw," though Richard Ellis considered this scenario unlikely. Nolan and Rosenblatt (1975) echoed Beebe's skepticism that the hooks were actually used to hook prey, though they proposed that "squid tentacles could conceivably be impaled on the hooks and the prey thus secured". It has also been proposed that Lasiognathus might form its mouth into a sort of sieve for filter feeding. More likely, prey is simply attracted by the glowing esca to within range of the jaws.

Stomach contents reveal that Lasiognathus feeds primarily on bony fishes, such as lanternfishes and bristlemouths, and occasionally takes invertebrates including copepods, amphipods, mysid shrimps, siphonophores, salps, pteropods, and chaetognaths. It is not known whether the males are parasitic; neither males nor larvae have yet been collected.

The six known species of Lasiognathus can only be distinguished by the morphology of the esca:

Lasiognathus amphirhamphus This species is characterized by having only two (as opposed to three) bony hooks on its esca, which are lightly pigmented. The distal escal appendage is elongated and cylindrical with a long, compressed prolongation at the tip as in L. saccostoma. The prolongation has six tiny filaments at the tip and no lateral serrations. The posterior escal appendage is broad and laterally compressed.
Lasiognathus beebei This species is distinguishable by its hooks being placed on a short, transverse, fan-shaped distal escal appendage as opposed to the elongated, cylindrical appendage of all other species.
Lasiognathus dinema This species is similar to any of the five previously described members of the genus, these species is unique in having a cylindrical, internally pigmented, anterior escal appendage and a pair of elongate distal escal appendages.
Lasiognathus intermedius This species has an elongated, cylindrical distal appendage with a short, cylindrical prolongation at the tip without any lateral serrations or filaments. The posterior escal appendage is cylindrical in shape. Its species name refers to its esca being intermediate in shape between those of L. beebei and those of L. saccostoma and L. waltoni.
Lasiognathus saccostoma This species has a slender, compressed prolongation at the tip of its elongated, cylindrical distal escal appendage, with numerous lateral serrations and distal filaments. Unlike in L. amphirhamphus, there are three escal hooks and they are darkly pigmented. The posterior escal appendage is broad and laterally compressed, and relatively larger than in L. amphirhamphus.
Lasiognathus waltoni This species is characterized by a membranous anterior crest on its escal bulb, and an elongated, cylindrical distal escal appendage without a prolongation at the tip.

References

Thaumatichthyidae
Taxa named by Charles Tate Regan
Marine fish genera